Paryani (Quechua parya reddish; copper; sparrow, Aymara -ni a suffix, hispanicized spelling Pariani) is a  volcano in the Andes of Bolivia. It is located in the Oruro Department, Sabaya Province, Sabaya Municipality. The cone of Paryani lies at the Salar de Coipasa, south of Pumiri and east of Tata Sabaya.

References 

Volcanoes of Oruro Department
Five-thousanders of the Andes